Česká zbrojovka a.s. Uherský Brod (CZUB) is an engineering company based in Uherský Brod, Czech Republic whose main activities include the production of service, hunting and sports firearms. It is owned by the Czech holding company Colt CZ Group SE, which also owns other brands with related production programmes.

CZUB currently has around 1800 employees. It is one of the highest volume exporters in the Czech Republic, sending its products to more than 100 countries around the world. The company is among the top ten small arms manufacturers in the world and five that manufactures automatic firearms. In 2021, CZUB acquired the Colt's Manufacturing Company; the following year, the parent company changed its name to Colt CZ Group.

History 

In 1919 Jihočeská zbrojovka was founded in Strakonice. Today's Česká zbrojovka a.s. was built as part of a large-scale transfer of strategically important production capacities of the former Czechoslovakia as far as possible from the western borders threatened by Nazi Germany. In Uherský Brod in the south-east of Moravia, a brand new arms factory was established in 1936, which was one of the most modern and most efficient factory at the time. In the first years of its existence it was successfully engaged primarily in the highly demanding production of aircraft machine guns.

1945 – 1992 
After World War II, the joint-stock company Česká zbrojovka was nationalized and its branch factory in Uherský Brod, which became independent in 1950, gradually became the main Czechoslovak manufacturer of small firearms. Its most famous products from the immediate post-war period were the Sa vz. 23 submachine guns, chambered in the common 9×19mm Parabellum cartridge (Later the 7.62×25mm Tokarev in vz. 24/26 after Czechoslovakia joined the Warsaw Pact). The Sa vz. 23 were the first production-model submachine guns with a telescoping bolt, which the bolt wraps around the barrel, which made the vz. 26 shorter and more compact than the other submachine guns at the time. By 1953, 545,000 were produced in Uherský Brod, 345,000 of which were of the 7.62 mm Tokarev variants.

The vz. 58 assault rifle chambered in the 7.62×39 mm cartridge, was a Czechoslovak alternative to the Soviet's AK-47 with an original design. This firearm was produced in Uherský Brod for the national armed forces as well as for export until 1984 and the total production volume reached about 920,000 units.

In 1961 Sa vz. 61 Škorpion machine pistol was introduced to fill the gap between submachine guns and semi-automatic pistols. More than 200,000 of these machine pistols in the standard .32 ACP cartridge were produced in Uherský Brod until 2000, and small batches of these machine pistols in the .380 ACP version were produced in the 1990s.

The CZ 75 semi-automatic pistol, revolutionary in a number of aspects, was the work of the well-known designer František Koucký, who worked on its development based on an assignment of today's Česká zbrojovka a.s since 1969. This firearm with perfect ergonomics and unique double-action trigger mechanism co-defined the category of Wonder Nines, i.e. large capacity SA/DA pistols chambered in 9×19mm Parabellum, and has long been one of the most popular of them.

1992 – present 
In 1992 Česká zbrojovka was privatized and transformed it into a joint-stock company, which concentrates its activities in its main plant in Uherský Brod on the development and production of high-quality firearms, while utilizing its remaining capacity for the production of high-precision components for the automotive and aerospace industry. The position of Česká zbrojovka, a.s. on the world's firearms market has significantly strengthened by the establishment of the subsidiary distribution and service company CZ-USA in 1997. This subsidiary started its activities in California, but in 1998 it relocated to Kansas City, Kansas, where it still operates. Within the creation of the international holding Česká zbrojovka Group (now Colt CZ Group), CZ-USA became an independent business entity.

In order to preserve the famous tradition of firearms production in Brno, Česká zbrojovka a.s began preparing to take over the firearms division of Zbrojovka Brno, a.s. The newly created company, originally named BRNO RIFLES, started its activities at the turn of 2006 and its domain was the production and development of break action firearms. In 2008 it became a subsidiary company of Česká zbrojovka a.s. In 2010 the company was renamed to Zbrojovka BRNO, s.r.o. In 2005 CZ became the owner of Dan Wesson Firearms through its subsidiary CZ-USA. This company, originally a revolver maker founded in 1968 by Daniel B. Wesson II, a grandson of Daniel B. Wesson, soon became one of the most distinguished manufacturers of modern M1911 pistol.

In 2011 the company began production of the new generation of CZ 805 BREN A1/A2 assault rifles, CZ SCORPION EVO 3 A1 submachine guns and CZ 805 BREN G1 grenade launchers for the Armed Forces of the Czech Republic. Česká zbrojovka a.s significantly penetrated foreign markets by opening a separate space for the assembly and repairs of CZ pistols at the FAME army plant in Lima, Peru. The Czech company participated in the project by supplying modern equipment and tools and training of technical personnel. This enabled the Peruvian company to assemble CZ guns, provide service and sell them on the Peruvian market and then throughout Latin America. It was the first case of technological transfer of Česká zbrojovka a.s to this promising region.

Since 2018, Česká zbrojovka a.s has been part of the international holding Česká zbrojovka Group SE that, in addition to the parent plant in Uherský Brod, gradually incorporates other companies with related production and development programmes. In cooperation with CZ-USA, the production of the first CZ firearms was launched in Kansas City, Kansas. These include selected models of the successful CZ P-10 series of pistols. In 2021 CZ bought Colt's Manufacturing Company and their Colt Canada subsidiary.

Notable developments 

Over the years Česká zbrojovka has developed several revolutionary or highly influential designs in various fields of small arms, most notably:
 vz. 23/25 submachine gun with overhanging bolt
 vz. 52 roller locked automatic pistol
 vz. 61 Škorpion ultra compact submachine gun with rate reducer
 vz. 75 high-capacity automatic pistol with cam unlocking

Current production

Pistols 
 CZ 75 - 9mm high-capacity automatic pistol with cam unlocking
 CZ P-07
 CZ P-09
 CZ P-10
 CZ SHADOW - A version of CZ 75 made for sport shooting 
 CZ SHADOW 2 - A second generation of the CZ SHADOW

Submachine guns 
 CZ Scorpion EVO 3

Rifles 
 CZ 457
 CZ 512
 CZ 600
 CZ 807 - Chambered in 5.56×45mm NATO and 7.62x39mm
 CZ TSR - A sniper rifle chambered in 7.62×51 mm NATO caliber
 CZ BREN 2 - Chambered in 5.56×45mm NATO and 7.62x39mm
 CZ 805 G1 - A grenade launcher

Discontinued products

Handguns 

 ČZ pistol, Modell 27 Kal,7.65 mm
 ČZ pistol, caliber 7.65 mm
 ČZ pistol, caliber 6.35 mm
 Model LK 38 pistol, 9 mm caliber
 DUO pistol, caliber 6.35 mm
 Target pistol, Model ZKP 493
 CZ 40P (Limited run, no longer in production)
 CZ 45
 CZ 50
 CZ 52
 CZ 70
 CZ 82 and CZ 83
 CZ 97B/BD.45acp B = DA/SA; BD = DA/SA with de-cocker
 CZ 100
 CZ 110
 CZ 122
 ZKR 590 Grand revolver, in calibers .38 and .22 and 7.62 Nagant short
 CZ 40B Joint venture with Colt

Smallbore rifles
 Model 242
 Model 243
 Model 244

 Model 245
 Model 246
 Model 247
 ZKM 452 2E
 CZ 452
 CZ 453
 CZ 455
 CZ 511
 CZ 513
 CZ 527, caliber .17 Hornet; .204 Ruger; .223 Rem; 7.62x39, etc.

Bigbore rifles
 CZ 550
 CZ 557
 CZ 584 combination gun,12 ga.x calibers 7x65R; 7×57R; 5.6×52R; 6.5×57R; .243, .308, .30-06, etc.

Aircraft machine guns
 LK 30
 MG 17

Military rifles

 vz. 24
 vz. 33
 vz. 52
 vz. 52/57
 vz. 58
 ČZ 2000
 CZ S 810 HROM

Submachine guns

 Škorpion vz. 61 (.32 ACP a.k.a. 7.65×17mm Browning SR)
 vz. 48 (9×19mm Parabellum and 7.62×25mm Tokarev).

Shotguns
 The CZ 581 Over and under shotgun, 12/12 bore;
 The CZ 585 Over and under shotgun; the over and under rifle/shotgun; the CZ 582 prepared for SKEET shooting

Miscellaneous

 Signal/flare pistol
 Components for the infantry fire-support machine gun models MG 34, MG 81, and the K 35 anti-aircraft cannon
 Alarm/starting pistols: UB 070 and 071 
 Signal pistols: 44/67, produced between 1981–1983
 Target pistol: Model ZKP 493
 Air rifles: Z 47, 235, 236, 237, 612, 614, 618, 620, 624, 630, 631, 632, 634, 800, 801 and 802
 Air pistol: Model ZVP, 4.5 mm
 Gas-fired pistol: The APP Automatic
 Air pistol: Tex, Model 3
 CO2 pistol: Model CZ 75D Compact, 4.5 mm
 Three shot automatic shotgun: CZ 241, 12, 16 and 20 gauge)
 Over and under shotguns: 12, 16 and 20 gauge
 Over and under ČZ models: 581 and 584 - 586
 Hunting rifles: ZKK 600, 601 and 602, calibers ranging from .243Win-.248Win
 Rifles: The ZKW 465 Hornet and the ZKW 465 Fox
 Small bore rifles: ZKM 452, 561, 573 and 581
 Rifles: ZKW 465, 680
 Rifle: CZ 537

See also
 Česká zbrojovka Strakonice
 :Category:Semi-automatic pistols of Czechoslovakia
 Gun politics in the Czech Republic
 Zbrojovka Brno

References

Literature
 David Pazdera, Jan Skramoušský: Česká zbrojovka. Historie výroby zbraní v Uherském Brodě [Česká zbrojovka. History of weapon manufacturing in Uherský Brod], 2006, .

External links
 
 Česká zbrojovka official website
 CZ-USA official website
 

Firearm manufacturers of the Czech Republic
Manufacturing companies of Czechoslovakia
 
Manufacturing companies established in 1919
Rifles
1919 establishments in Czechoslovakia